The Boca West International is a defunct tennis tournament that was part of Bill Riordan's International Players Association (IPA) circuit from 1975–1976. The event was held in Boca Raton, Florida and was played on outdoor hard courts.

Past finals

Singles

Doubles

References
 ATP Archives

Hard court tennis tournaments in the United States
Boca West International
Boca West International
1975 establishments in Florida
Recurring sporting events established in 1975
1976 disestablishments in Florida
Recurring sporting events disestablished in 1976
Sports in Boca Raton, Florida